William Slade (died March 16, 1868) was the White House Usher, at the time, "one of the highest posts available to a black Washingtonian"; he acted as valet, confidential messenger,  door keeper, and majordomo to Abraham Lincoln (t. 1861 – 1868).

Career
Previously Slade had kept a boardinghouse in Washington and served as a messenger in the Treasury Department. When Slade became Lincoln's majordomo, he became trusted by Lincoln with confidential secrets. In his 1942 book They Knew Lincoln, historian John Washington calls Slade the “confidential messenger and confidant” to the President, wherein the President would give Slade private missions to perform and in exchange Slade "kept the closest mouth on all public affairs and would never discuss any of Lincoln’s plans or business with anyone." After his death, Slade's daughter recorded that her father had destroyed some old documents of Lincoln's. In addition, Lincoln used to test the lines of some of his speeches out on Slade.

He was an elder at the 15th Street Presbyterian Church, Washington. Slade was also an activist within his community. He urged Lincoln to give Washington D.C.'s African American men a say over the officers who were selected for their regiments. He also was active in arguing for the right to vote, and he corresponded with Frederick Douglass about the Johnson White House after Lincoln's death.

In popular culture
In the 2012 film Lincoln directed by  Steven Spielberg, Slade was played by Stephen McKinley Henderson.

References

Lincoln administration personnel
African-American people
White House staff
19th-century American people
American Presbyterians